Jean Emmanuel Taillefer (11 January 1869 – 8 June 1941) was a French fencer. He competed in the men's épée and the men's foil events at the 1900 Summer Olympics.

References

External links
 

1869 births
1941 deaths
French male épée fencers
French male foil fencers
Olympic fencers of France
Fencers at the 1900 Summer Olympics
Sportspeople from Gironde